Florida's 5th House District elects one member of the Florida House of Representatives. The district is represented by Brad Drake. This district is located in the Florida Panhandle, and encompasses part of the Emerald Coast. The district covers all of Walton County, Holmes County, Washington County, Jackson County, and part of northern Bay County. The largest city in the district is Marianna. As of the 2010 Census, the district's population is 159,198.

This district contains Chipola College, located in Marianna, and the Baptist College of Florida, located in Graceville.

Representatives from 1967 to the present

See also 

 Florida's 2nd Senate district
 Florida's 1st congressional district
 Florida's 2nd congressional district

References 

05
Walton County, Florida
Holmes County, Florida
Washington County, Florida
Jackson County, Florida
Bay County, Florida